is a Kofun period keyhole-shaped burial mound, located in the Uedai neighborhood of the city of Izumi, Osaka in the Kansai region of Japan. The tumulus was designated a National Historic Site of Japan in 2008. It is noted for the bronze mirrors found within. These and other artifacts excavated from the tumulus are collectively designated a National Important Cultural Property.

Overview
It is located at the northwestern end of Shintayama hill, surrounded paddy fields, but the location is also close to the ancient provincial capital of former Izumi Province. The tumulus has a total length of about 94 meters. The presence of a kofun at this location has been known since antiquity, but in November 1945,  a 17-year-old student noticed that the tumulus was severely damaged and convinced local authorities that a rescue archaeology excavation be performed. At that time, a leather-lacquered shield with copper decorations, iron swords and other metal artifacts were discovered. In 1950 to 1951, further excavation of the posterior circular portion by the Osaka Prefectural Board of Education and the Japanese Archaeological Association found the burial chamber within which three clay-covered wooden caskets were found side by side. The central casket had the remains of a woman, and she was flanked on either side with the remains of two men. Within and surrounding these coffins were a large quantity of grave goods, including Shinju-kyo mirrors, magatama beads and other jewelry, fragments of armor and a helm, iron swords, spears and other weapons, and other artifacts. The inscription of one of the mirror gave the reign date of Keisho 3, which corresponds to 238 AD. These excavated items are now are in the possession of the Tokyo National Museum.

Further excavation were conducted from 2001 to 2005 by the Izumi City Board of Education which confirmed the scale of the tumulus, and recovered many cylindrical and figurative haniwa. From the haniwa and other artifacts, is thought that the tumulus was completed in the  latter half of the 4th century.

The tumulus is about 20 minutes on foot from Tonoki Station on the JR West Hanwa Line.

Total length 94 meters:
Anterior rectangular portion 42 meters wide x 6.5 meters high, 2-tier
Posterior circular portion 57 meter diameter x 9 meters high, 2-tiers

See also
List of Historic Sites of Japan (Osaka)

References

External links

Izumi City home page

History of Osaka Prefecture
Izumi, Osaka
Historic Sites of Japan
Archaeological sites in Japan
Kofun